The 1991–92 SMU Mustangs men's basketball team represented Southern Methodist University during the 1991–92 men's college basketball season.

Schedule

|-
!colspan=9 style=| Southwest tournament

References 

SMU Mustangs men's basketball seasons
SMU
SMU
SMU